Alexandro Calut (born 22 April 2003) is a Belgian professional footballer who plays as a left back for Standard Liège in the Belgian First Division A.

Club career
Calut made his professional debut with Standard Liège in a 2–1 Belgian First Division A win to K.A.A. Gent on 8 May 2021.

References

External links
 

2003 births
Living people
Belgian footballers
Belgium youth international footballers
Association football defenders
Standard Liège players
Belgian Pro League players
SL16 FC players
Challenger Pro League players